is a Japanese football player for Tokushima Vortis.

Playing career
Ishio was born in Osaka Prefecture on May 18, 2000. He joined the J1 League club Cerezo Osaka as part of the youth team in 2018.

References

External links

2000 births
Living people
Association football people from Osaka Prefecture
Japanese footballers
J1 League players
J3 League players
Cerezo Osaka players
Cerezo Osaka U-23 players
Zweigen Kanazawa players
Association football defenders